The Men's 10 metre platform competition at the 2019 World Aquatics Championships was held on 19 and 20 July 2019.

Results
The preliminary round was started on 19 July at 10:00. The semifinal was held on 19 July at 15:30. The final was held on 20 July at 20:45.

Green denotes finalists

Blue denotes semifinalists

References

Men's 10 metre platform